Frederick Stephani (June 13, 1903 – October 31, 1962) was a screenwriter and film director. He is best known for co-writing and directing the 13-chapter science fiction serial Flash Gordon in 1936. The serial became Universal's second highest-grossing productions that year. Despite its success, this was the first and only serial Stephani directed over the course of his career, possibly due to its shortcomings in special effects and overall production values, even by contemporary standards. Stephani continued to write, produce and direct feature films and television episodes into the 1960s.

Selected filmography
Flash Gordon (1936) - writer and director
Fast Company (1938) - producer
Tarzan's New York Adventure (1942) - producer
Steve Randall (1952, TV series) - writer and director
Passport to Danger (1954, TV series) - writer and director
Bombs on Monte Carlo (1960) - writer
The Deputy (1961, TV series) - director

References

External links

1903 births
1962 deaths
Mass media people from Bonn
American mass media people
German emigrants to the United States